Tugu Stadium is a football stadium located at South Tugu, Koja, North Jakarta, Jakarta. This stadium is the based of Liga 3 team, Persitara North Jakarta. The stadium has a capacity that can accommodate around 4,000 people.

History
This stadium was built in 1987. Initially the location where this stadium stood was a swamp area where snakes were found. The stadium underwent rehabilitation in 2006–07 and was only handed over in 2008. Then got rehab back in 2012.

Facilities
The stadium is equipped with field facilities, lighting with a power of 2,500 watts, changing rooms, toilets, management room, ample parking space and spectator stands with a capacity of 4,000 people. Tugu Stadium has an area of 35,000 square meters, with a soccer field area of 7,346.49 square meters. The area of ​​the track field is 3,600 square meters, the area of ​​the west tribune is 870.40 square meters, the area of ​​the east tribune is 205.19 square meters, and the east parking lot area is 2,850 square meters. In addition, Tugu Stadium also has an office space under the stands and a room that functions as a prayer room.

Renovation
The stadium underwent renovation and rehabilitation in 2006–2007 and was only handed over in 2008. It was then rehabilitated again in 2012.

The DKI Jakarta Provincial Government has again revitalized the Tugu Stadium. The stadium will be completely renovated in 2022. Total rehabilitation of this stadium is FIFA certified and has MSME facilities. The Governor of DKI Jakarta, Anies Baswedan said that the renovation of the Tugu Stadium would be carried out completely so that it could become an international standard stadium. The plan was conveyed while attending the celebration of the 42nd anniversary of Persitara North Jakarta.

The revitalization of the Tugu Stadium is carried out in two stages of development. The first phase focuses on field development. Then, the second phase focuses on the construction of supporting facilities such as stands. The revitalization is targeted to be completed in December 2023 with a total budget of 181 billion Rupiah.

References

External links 
 

1987 establishments in Indonesia
North Jakarta
Football venues in Indonesia
Sports venues in Jakarta